Motomel S.A. is a  brand of Argentine motorcycle, based in Buenos Aires Province; founded in 1992 by the La Emilia investment group.

History
The La Emilia factory has its origins in 1892. Two brothers established the first textile factory in Argentina located in the outskirts of Buenos Aires, in La Emilia. As the company grew in the Argentine market, it started to manufacture other products within its facilities. In 1992 the La Emilia factory changed course and began to assemble Suzuki motorcycles under the name of Motomel.

Motomel today
As of 2017, Motomel is the largest company importing motorcycles in Argentina and these motorcycles are also being re exported to some other countries in South America. Motomel assembles almost 150,000 motorcycles per year.

External links 
 
 Club of Motomeleros
Motomel Motorcycles at Fuelarc.com

Motorcycle manufacturers of Argentina
Argentine brands